Kostas Lazaridis (1900–1943) was a famous Greek trade unionist. He was a member of Central Committee of Greek Communist Party. Also he was a General Secretary of the worker's section of National Liberation Front (Greece).

Early years
He was born in 1900 in Iasmos, which was then part of the Ottoman Empire. From his youth he became a communist member and took part in several Greek elections. In Metaxas dictatorship he will be a political outlaw. In 1937 he was arrested and went to prison. The dictatorship delivered him along with the others political prisoners to Axis Forces.
In the prison of Akronauplia he learned some words from a Slavic dialect, and with the permission of Giannis Ioannides (2nd in KKE ranks) he declared Bulgarian ethnicity in order to get free and reconstruct the Greek communist Party.

Axis Occupation
He was the secretary of the Workers Committee and also a high-ranked member of KKE. For his activity was shot by Nazis in 1943.

Family
His wife was sentenced to death by Bulgarian occupation army for her activities. He had a daughter and son, well known from the case Nikos Beloyannis.

Notes

1900 births
1943 deaths
Communist Party of Greece politicians
Greek prisoners and detainees
Prisoners and detainees of Greece
National Liberation Front (Greece) members
Greek people executed by Nazi Germany
Greek trade unionists
People from Rhodope (regional unit)
Executed communists